Barbour's tropical ground snake (Trimetopon barbouri), also known commonly as Barbour's pygmy snake, is a species of snake in the family Colubridae. The species is endemic to Panama.

Etymology
The specific name, barbouri, is in honor of American herpetologist Thomas Barbour.

Geographic range
T. barbouri is endemic to the western region of Panama, and occasionally is found on Barro Colorado Island.

Habitat

Description
T. barbouri has two normal prefrontals, unlike other species of its genus which have the prefrontals fused.

Reproduction
T. barbouri is oviparous.

References

Further reading
Derry J, Ruback P, Ray JM (2015). "Range extension and notes on the natural history of Trimetopon barbouri Dunn, 1930 (Serpentes: Colubridae)". Mesoamerican Herpetology 2 (1): 136–139.
Dunn ER (1930). "New Snakes from Costa Rica and Panama". Occasional Papers of the Boston Society of Natural History 5: 329–332. (Trimetopon barbouri, new species, p. 331).

Colubrids
Taxa named by Emmett Reid Dunn
Reptiles described in 1930
Reptiles of Panama